Naitini N Tuiyau (June 16, 1915 - March 1, 2002) was a Fijian cricketer and rugby union player.

Tuiyau was a right-handed batsman and made his first-class debut for Fiji in 1954 against Otago during Fiji's 1953/54 tour of New Zealand. During the tour he played three further first-class matches, with his final first-class match for Fiji coming against Auckland.

In his 4 first-class matches for Fiji he scored 170 runs at a batting average of 21.25, with a high score of 33. In the field Tuiyau took 4 catches.

Tuiyau also represented Fiji in 10 non first-class matches for Fiji in 1954. Tuiyau's final match for Fiji came against Bay of Plenty during the 1953/54 tour.

In rugby union he played as a scrum-half and featured in five Test matches for Fiji, two against Tonga in 1947 and three against New Zealand Maori the following year.

External links
Naitini Tuiyau at Cricinfo
Naitini Tuiyau at CricketArchive
Naitini Tuiyau at ESPN Scrum

1915 births
Fijian cricketers
Fiji international rugby union players
2002 deaths
People from Cakaudrove Province